Kalanour railway station is a railway station on Moradabad–Ambala line under the Ambala railway division of Northern Railway zone. This is situated at Mandauli, Kalanour in Yamunanagar district of the Indian state of Haryana.

References

Railway stations in Yamunanagar district
Ambala railway division